Avni Pepa (born 14 November 1988) is a professional footballer who plays as a defender for Norwegian club Arendal. Born in Norway, he represented the Kosovo national team at international level.

Club career

IK Start
On 14 March 2010. Pepa made his debut in the Tippeligaen, he entered the field to replace Hunter Freeman, against Sandefjord. On 7 July, he scored his first goal for IK Start. It was his goal that allowed the team to overcome Fredrikstad, in the Norwegian Cup. On 24 October, he scored his first league goal against Stabæk from an assist by Petter Bruer Hanssen.

Loan at Mandalskameratene
In 2007. Pepa was loaned to OBOS-ligaen side Mandalskameratene. On 17 June 2007, he made his debut in a 2–1 home defeat against Sparta Sarpsborg after being named in the starting line-up. On 24 June 2007, he scored his first and only goal for Mandalskameratene, in a 3-1 defeat against Notodden.

Sandnes Ulf
After IK Start was relegated from Tippeligaen. Pepa signed with the newly promoted team Sandnes Ulf as a free agent.

Flamurtari Vlorë
On 9 January 2015. Pepa signed to Albanian Superliga side Flamurtari Vlorë. On 3 February 2015, he left Flamurtari Vlorë, because of problems with the team staff.

ÍBV
On 19 February 2015. Pepa signed to Úrvalsdeild karla side ÍBV. On 3 May 2015, he made his debut in a 1–0 away defeat against Fjölnir after being named in the starting line-up.

Arendal
On 12 July 2017. Pepa signed with the newly promoted team of OBOS-ligaen side Arendal. He joined with his brother Wilhelm Pepa. On 23 July 2017, he made his debut in a 1–1 away draw against Tromsdalen UIL after being named in the starting line-up.

International career
On 2 March 2014. Pepa received a call-up from Kosovo for the first permitted by FIFA match against Haiti and making his debut after being named in the starting line-up.

Career statistics

References

External links

 

1988 births
Living people
Sportspeople from Kristiansand
Norwegian people of Kosovan descent
Association football defenders
Kosovan footballers
Kosovo international footballers
Norwegian footballers
IK Start players
Mandalskameratene players
Sandnes Ulf players
Íþróttabandalag Vestmannaeyja players
Arendal Fotball players
Eliteserien players
Norwegian First Division players
Úrvalsdeild karla (football) players
Norwegian expatriate footballers
Kosovan expatriate footballers
Expatriate footballers in Iceland
Norwegian expatriate sportspeople in Iceland